277 Fifth (also called 281 Fifth Avenue) is a condominium tower in Manhattan, New York City designed by architect Rafael Viñoly. The building rises 55 stories and contains 130 residential condominiums. It is tied with two other buildings, One Grand Central Place and the Barclay Tower as the 81st tallest building in New York at 209 meters. It has been compared to another building of Viñoly's, 432 Park Avenue.

History
In 2012, Kushner Real Estate Group and Ironstate Development acquired the three buildings at 277, 279, and 281 Fifth Avenue. Victor Group purchased the site in June 2014 for $99 million and later purchased 273 and 275 Fifth Avenue for $50.3 million. In total, Victor Group reportedly spent a total of $174.1 million for the land and air rights underpinning the project. In early 2015, the Australian Lendlease purchased a stake in the project which valued it at approximately $400 million.

Plans for the building were first announced later in 2015, and construction began in 2016. In February 2017, the developers received a $269 million construction loan from three Singaporean banks including United Overseas Bank, OCBC Bank and DBS Bank. Chinese firm Beijing Shokai Group also invested $100 million in preferred equity in the project.

The building topped out in March 2018 and was completed by the end of the year.

Usage
The building is residential. The building offers a fairly limited set of amenities compared to other, similar buildings.

See also
 List of tallest buildings in New York City

References

Condominiums and housing cooperatives in Manhattan
Fifth Avenue
Rafael Viñoly buildings
Residential buildings completed in 2018
Residential buildings in Manhattan